Joseph Harry Fowler Connick (born March 27, 1926) is an American attorney who served as the district attorney of Orleans Parish (New Orleans), Louisiana, from 1973 to 2003. 

His son, Harry Connick Jr., is an American musician. Connick is also a singer, long performing a few nights a week at local clubs as a hobby.

Early life
Joseph Harry Fowler Connick was born in Mobile, Alabama, the second of eight children of Jessie Catherine (née Fowler, 1898–1985) and James Paul Connick (1901–1979). Both his parents and grandparents were from Mobile.  His father worked for the United States Army Corps of Engineers. When Harry was two years old, the family moved to New Orleans.

Music was a large part of his early life, and he was particularly influenced by Glenn Miller. After high school, he served in the U.S. Navy in the Pacific during World War II. After the war, he returned to New Orleans and graduated from Loyola University New Orleans with a degree in business administration.

He later joined the U.S. Army Corps of Engineers as a civilian employee, where he met his future wife, Anita Livingston, an accomplished flute player who became a lawyer and judge. She was one of the first female judges in the city of New Orleans. They married in Tunisia, and spent time in Casablanca, where Connick Sr. contracted tuberculosis. They were sent back to the United States and eventually ended up in New Orleans again. When Harry and Anita Connick returned to New Orleans, they opened a record store. Ultimately they owned two stores while simultaneously pursuing law degrees, one working in the store while the other was at school. They also had a daughter, Suzanna, and a son, Harry Jr.

Music and life in New Orleans
Connick is still involved in New Orleans music and culture. In 1993, he and his son were part of the group that founded the Krewe of Orpheus, a superkrewe that participates in annual Mardi Gras parades. He was nicknamed "The Singing District Attorney" by Time magazine. This nickname was given to him because he spent many nights singing in clubs in the French Quarter, including Maxwell's Toulouse Cabaret.

New Orleans District Attorney
In 1973, Connick defeated incumbent New Orleans District Attorney Jim Garrison, who had recently been tried and acquitted of corruption charges.

As district attorney, he was the defendant and petitioner in Connick v. Myers, a free speech case in public employment law. In the case, Connick asked Sheila Myers to take a transfer to another position in his office. She had resisted, finally saying she would consider it after a meeting with Connick. Later the same day she distributed a questionnaire on issues of employee morale to her fellow prosecutors, after which Connick fired her.

Myers sued in federal court, alleging Connick violated her First Amendment rights by firing her. He maintained she had been fired for refusing the transfer, but judge Jack Gordon of the Eastern District of Louisiana held that the distribution of the questionnaire was speech on a matter of public concern and thus constitutionally protected. Since the facts indicated to him that Myers had been fired for it, he ordered her reinstated. After the Fifth Circuit affirmed Gordon, the Supreme Court granted certiorari and narrowly reversed the ruling, holding that Myers' questionnaire largely touched on matters internal to the office that were not of public concern and thus she was lawfully fired.

In 1987, Connick waged an unsuccessful challenge to incumbent William J. "Billy" Guste Jr. for the position of Louisiana Attorney General. Guste prevailed over Connick, 516,658 (54%) to 440,984 (46%). Both were registered Democrats, but in Louisiana a general election can feature two members of the same party.

In 1989, Connick was indicted on racketeering charges for aiding and abetting a gambling operation by returning gambling records to an arrested gambler. He stated that he returned the records to the man in question because he needed them to file tax returns. On July 25, 1990, he was acquitted.

In 1995, while District Attorney, Connick promised to the Assassination Records Review Board and at a public meeting in New Orleans that he would donate the Garrison investigative files which were still in his office. According to the Review Board's final report, Connick instructed one of his investigators Gary Raymond to destroy these documents after he took office. Raymond took them home instead and kept them because he didn't feel good burning the records stating, "It's not every day you are assigned to burn the records of investigations into the assassination of a President," until he found out about the Review Board in 1995 after which he gave the records to the television reporter Richard Angelico for Angelico to deliver the records to Congress stating, "When Congress asks for all documents, they mean all documents." A battle ensued between Connick and the Review Board after Connick demanded that the papers were returned to him and threatening to withhold the investigation papers. After many subpoenas going both ways, and with the help of the Justice Department, the Review Board won and all of the documents in question are in the JFK Collection.

In 2003, Connick did not seek re-election and was inducted into the Louisiana Political Museum and Hall of Fame in Winnfield.

Controversies

Prosecutorial misconducts and innocents on death row
There are several allegations of systemic misconduct by Connick and his prosecutors. "According to the Innocence Project, a national organization that represents incarcerated criminals claiming innocence, 36 men convicted in Orleans Parish during Connick's 30-year tenure as DA have made allegations of prosecutorial misconduct, and 19 have had their sentences overturned or reduced as a result."

In the case of Shareef Cousin, Connick's attorneys withheld a key witness statement from the defense, arguing that the prosecution was under no legal obligation to disclose such information. As a result, Cousin was put on death row at the age of 16, but the conviction and death sentence were overturned after four years, in 1999.

Charges

In 2007, John Thompson, who was wrongfully convicted of murder by Connick's DA office due to evidence withholding, was awarded a $14 million verdict by a federal court jury. The jury found "that Thompson's 18 years behind bars (14 of which he spent in solitary confinement on death row) were caused by Connick's deliberate failure to train his prosecutors on their obligations to turn over exculpatory evidence."  The Orleans Parish DA's office appealed and the case, Connick v. Thompson, was orally argued before the U.S. Supreme Court during the October 2010 term. By a 5–4 vote split along ideological lines, the Supreme Court overturned the $14 million award in a decision issued on March 29, 2011. The majority opinion, written by Justice Clarence Thomas, construed the series of admitted violations to not amount to a pattern of "similar" violations of Brady v. Maryland (1963), and such a pattern was necessary to hold Connick liable for the incompetence of his employees. The dissenting opinion, read from the bench by Justice Ruth Bader Ginsburg, noted that Connick's office had in fact committed a pattern of violations, failing to disclose exculpatory blood type evidence, failing to disclose audio tapes of witness testimony, failing to disclose a deathbed confession of evidence destruction by the prosecuting attorney Gerry Deegan, and failing to disclose eyewitness identification of the killer that did not match Thompson. Ginsburg noted that the office had employee turnover so high a young attorney could advance to a senior supervisory position within four years, thus the office offered little training in ongoing developments in criminal procedure law despite its large number of inexperienced attorneys.

Personal life 

Connick is a Roman Catholic of Irish, English, Northern Irish, and German ancestry.

Connick's first wife, Anita Frances Livingston (née Levy), was Jewish (her parents had emigrated from Minsk and Vienna, respectively). They raised their two children, Suzanna and Harry, Jr., in the Lakeview neighborhood of New Orleans.; Harry Connick Jr. is an American musician.  Anita Livingston died of ovarian cancer in July, 1981. 

Connick later married Londa Jean Matherne on March 25, 1995, in County Tipperary, Ireland. 

Connick is the uncle of Jefferson Parish District Attorney Paul Connick and State Senator Patrick Connick, also of Jefferson Parish.

References

1926 births
Businesspeople from Louisiana
Loyola University New Orleans alumni
District attorneys in Louisiana
Louisiana Democrats
Living people
Politicians from New Orleans
Lawyers from Mobile, Alabama
Tulane University Law School alumni
Lawyers from New Orleans
United States Navy personnel of World War II